Mo'unga  (foaled 20 November 2017) is a New Zealand bred race horse that has won multiple  Group 1 races in Australia.

Background

Bred by Waikato Stud in New Zealand, Mo'unga was sold at the 2019 Karaka Yearling Sale.  He was purchased for $325,000 by Aquis Farm and relocated to their property in Queensland, Australia.

Racing career

Mo'unga contested his first race on the 20 June 2020 at Gold Coast Racecourse in a 2-year-old Maiden race which he one by one length.   He was successful in his next two starts at Newcastle and Rosehill before finishing in 7th placing behind Ole Kirk in the Caulfield Guineas.  Jockey Damien Oliver said after the race, "I thought he ran well. He’s going to be a really nice horse next preparation with a bit of give in the ground."

In December 2020 it was announced that Mo'unga would change trainers from Chris Waller to Annabel Neasham.

After running placings in the C S Hayes Stakes and Randwick Guineas, Mo'unga won his first Group 1 race in the 2020 Rosehill  Guineas.  He won his second Group 1 five months later in the Winx Stakes at Randwick.

He was second to Sierra Sue in the 2022 Futurity Stakes (MRC) (1400m) at Caulfield, ahead of Tofane.

Pedigree

References 

Racehorses bred in New Zealand
Racehorses trained in Australia
2017 racehorse births